An IVMS (In Vehicle Monitoring System) combines the installation of an electronic device in a vehicle, or fleet of vehicles, with purpose-designed computer software at least at one operational base to enable the owner or a third party to track the vehicle's location, collecting data in the process from the field and deliver it to the base of operation. Modern vehicle tracking systems commonly use GPS technology for locating the vehicle, but other types of automatic vehicle location technology can also be used. Vehicle information can be viewed on electronic maps via the Internet or specialized software.

IVMS devices are typically installed into vehicles on a permanent basis and they are normally hidden away, so at to prevent driver tampering. Modern vehicles however have mostly digital circuitry, something which do not facilitate the cutting of wires and information is relayed from the vehicle to the IVMS unit through what is known as a CANBUS adaptor, enabling plug-and-play installations. The phenomenon of what is known as "Portable IVMS" is also becoming more common. These are devices that are premade and provided for self-installations, something which has a double benefit: the services of auto electricians are no longer required and vehicle owners can easily move the IVMS device from one vehicle to another. 

Urban public transit authorities, Mining companies and Transport/Freight companies are an increasingly common user of vehicle tracking systems.

Several types of vehicle tracking devices exist. Typically they are classified as "passive" and "active".

"Passive" devices store GPS location, speed, heading and sometimes a trigger event such as key on/off, door open/closed. Once the vehicle returns to a predetermined point, the device is removed and the data downloaded to a computer for evaluation.

"Active" devices also collect the same information but usually transmit the data in real-time via cellular or satellite networks to a computer or data center for evaluation. The information is typically analysed and presented using web based technologies.

Many modern IVMS devices combine both active and semi-passive tracking abilities: when a cellular network is available and a tracking device is connected it transmits data to a server; when a network is not available the device stores data in internal memory and will transmit stored data to the server later when the network becomes available again. So, although the actual upload is Active, there is a time delay between the time the position is recorded and the time it is sent back-to-base, making the units semi-passive. Where IVMS is used to drive driver safety and improve on general driver behaviour, this makes no difference in reality: data gets uploaded (delayed) but is still available for post-processing purposes, so overnight safety reports are not affected by this provided the vehicle comes back into coverage later during that day.

Historically IVMS has been accomplished by installing a box into the vehicle, either self-powered with a battery or wired into the vehicle's power system. For detailed vehicle locating and tracking this is still the predominant method; however, many companies are increasingly interested in the emerging cell phone technologies that provide tracking of multiple entities, such as both a salesperson and their vehicle. These systems also offer tracking of calls, texts, Web use and generally provide a wider safety net for the staff member and the vehicle.

The implementation of IVMS often has significant cost savings: by getting drivers to slow down and drive more carefully, stress is also taken off vehicles. This in the end has savings not only in terms of fuel, but also in terms of general vehicle wear-and-tear like brake pads and disks and engine wear.

References

Vehicle technology